Don't Heal Me is a 2021 Russian satirical film directed by Mikhail Marales. It was theatrically released in Russia on January 14, 2021.

Plot 
The film is about a trauma surgeon who constantly gets into trouble as a result of his kindness, but at the same time he maintains a positive outlook on life in spite of all enemies and circumstances.

Cast

Awards
The film received three awards at the Solaris 2021 Film Festival - Best Comedy Film, Best Actor (Yankovsky) and Best Supporting Actor (Nagiyev).

References

External links 
 

2021 films
2020s Russian-language films
2020s satirical films
2021 black comedy films
Russian satirical films
Russian black comedy films
Films about physicians
2021 directorial debut films